The Western Liang (400–421) was a state of the Sixteen Kingdoms in China, one of the "Five Liang" (Wu Liang) of this era. Western Liang was founded by the Li family of the Han Chinese.  The founder of the Tang Dynasty, Li Yuan (Emperor Gaozu), traced his patrilineal ancestry to the Western Liang rulers, and traced the ancestry of the Western Liang rulers to Li Guang and Laozi in the paternal line. The Li family of Western Liang were known as the Longxi Li lineage (隴西李氏).

All rulers of the Western Liang proclaimed themselves "wang".

Rulers of the Western Liang

Rulers family tree

See also
Dunhuang
Han Chinese
Jiuquan
Gansu
Liangzhou District
List of past Chinese ethnic groups
Sixteen Kingdoms
Wuwei, Gansu
Wu Hu

References

 
400 establishments
421 disestablishments
Dynasties in Chinese history
Former countries in Chinese history
4th-century establishments in China
5th-century disestablishments in China